Don Pepe may refer to:

People
José Figueres Ferrer (1906–1990), Costa Rican politician; President three times
José Amalfitani (1894–1969), Argentine construction manager, sports journalist and association football executive
José de la Rosa, 19th-century Mexican composer, printer, singer and guitarist living in California

Other
Gran Meliá Don Pepe, hotel in Marbella, Spain
Don Pepe, 20th century Cuban magazine by Néstor Carbonell y Rivero; see Cuban authors and writers
 Don Pepe, a brand of cigar; see List of cigar brands

See also
Don (disambiguation)
Pepe (disambiguation)